Bolbena is a genus of praying mantises native to Africa. It includes the following species:
Bolbena assimilis
Bolbena hottentotta
Bolbena maraisi
Bolbena minor
Bolbena minutissima
Bolbena orientalis

See also
List of mantis genera and species

References 

 
Nanomantidae
Arthropods of Africa
Mantodea genera